Thomas Bulkeley (died 1593), of Beaumaris, Anglesey, Wales and Lincoln's Inn, London, was a politician.

He was a Member (MP) of the Parliament of England for Beaumaris 1584, 1586, 1589 and 1593.

References

Year of birth missing
1593 deaths
16th-century Welsh politicians
Members of Lincoln's Inn
People from Beaumaris
English MPs 1584–1585
English MPs 1586–1587
English MPs 1589
English MPs 1593
Bulkeley family
Members of the Parliament of England for Beaumaris